Luu may refer to:
Luu, a Vietnamese surname
LUU, an initialism for the Leeds University Union, the representative body for the students at the University of Leeds, England
Jane Luu, a Vietnamese American astronomer
Luu Bu, an alternate spelling of Lü Bu, (156–198) a military general and minor warlord during the late Eastern Han Dynasty and Three Kingdoms period in ancient China
Luu Dongbin, an alternate spelling of Lü Dongbin, a Chinese deity revered by Daoists
Luu Vinh Phuc, an alternate spelling of Liu Yongfu (1837–1917) the second and last President of the Republic of Formosa from June 5, 1895 to October 21, 1895 
Empress Luu, an alternate spelling of Empress Lü Zhi (d. 180 BC) the wife of Emperor Gao of the Han Dynasty in China